The following is a list of Seattle Mariners professional baseball players and managers who have won various awards or other accolades from Major League Baseball or other organizations or have led the American League in some statistical category at the end of the season.

Awards

American League MVP

Ken Griffey Jr. (1997)
Ichiro Suzuki (2001)

American League Cy Young

Randy Johnson (1995)
Félix Hernández (2010)

American League Rookie of the Year

Alvin Davis (1984)
Kazuhiro Sasaki (2000)
Ichiro Suzuki (2001)
Kyle Lewis (2020)
Julio Rodríguez (2022)

American League Reliever of the Year

JJ Putz (2007)
Edwin Díaz (2018)

American League Manager of the Year

Lou Piniella (1995, 2001)

American League Gold Glove Award

Each player indicated with position at which he won the award.
1987: Mark Langston (P)
1988: Harold Reynolds (2B), Mark Langston (P)
1989: Harold Reynolds (2B)
1990: Harold Reynolds (2B), Ken Griffey Jr. (OF)
1991: Ken Griffey Jr. (OF)
1992: Ken Griffey Jr. (OF)
1993: Omar Vizquel (SS), Ken Griffey Jr. (OF)
1994: Ken Griffey Jr. (OF)
1995: Ken Griffey Jr. (OF)
1996: Jay Buhner (OF), Ken Griffey Jr. (OF)
1997: Ken Griffey Jr. (OF)
1998: Ken Griffey Jr. (OF)
1999: Ken Griffey Jr. (OF)
2000: John Olerud (1B)
2001: Mike Cameron (OF), Ichiro Suzuki (OF)
2002: John Olerud (1B), Bret Boone (2B), Ichiro Suzuki (OF)
2003: John Olerud (1B), Bret Boone (2B), Ichiro Suzuki (OF), Mike Cameron (OF)
2004: Bret Boone (2B), Ichiro Suzuki (OF)
2005: Ichiro Suzuki (OF)
2006: Ichiro Suzuki (OF)
2007: Adrián Beltré (3B), Ichiro Suzuki (OF)
2008: Adrián Beltré (3B), Ichiro Suzuki (OF)
2009: Ichiro Suzuki (OF)
2010: Ichiro Suzuki (OF), Franklin Gutiérrez (OF)
2014: Kyle Seager (3B)
2020: Evan White (1B), J. P. Crawford, (SS)

Wilson Defensive Player of the Year Award

See explanatory note at Atlanta Braves award winners and league leaders.
Team (at all positions)
 2012 Brendan Ryan (SS)
 2013 Dustin Ackley (2B)
 2018 Mike Zunino (C)

American League Silver Slugger Award

Each player indicated with position at which he won the award.
1991: Ken Griffey Jr. (OF)
1992: Edgar Martínez (3B)
1993: Ken Griffey Jr. (OF)
1994: Ken Griffey Jr. (OF)
1995: Edgar Martínez (DH)
1996: Alex Rodriguez (SS), Ken Griffey Jr. (OF)
1997: Ken Griffey Jr. (OF), Edgar Martínez (DH)
1998: Alex Rodriguez (SS), Ken Griffey Jr. (OF)
1999: Alex Rodriguez (SS), Ken Griffey Jr. (OF)
2000: Alex Rodriguez (SS)
2001: Bret Boone (2B), Ichiro Suzuki (OF), Edgar Martínez (DH)
2003: Bret Boone (2B), Edgar Martínez (DH)
2007: Ichiro Suzuki (OF)
2009: Ichiro Suzuki (OF)
2017: Nelson Cruz (DH)
2022: Julio Rodríguez (OF)

Edgar Martínez Award

Note: Originally known as the Outstanding Designated Hitter Award, the award was named after longtime Mariners designated hitter Edgar Martínez, who won the award five times, in 2004.

1979: Willie Horton
1995: Edgar Martínez
1997: Edgar Martínez
1998: Edgar Martínez
2000: Edgar Martínez
2001: Edgar Martínez
2017: Nelson Cruz

Roberto Clemente Award

Harold Reynolds (1991)
Jamie Moyer (2003)
Edgar Martínez (2004)

MLB "This Year in Baseball Awards"
See: This Year in Baseball Awards#Award winners
Note: Voted by fans as the best in all of Major League Baseball (i.e., not two awards, one for each league).

"This Year in Baseball Awards" Dependable Player of the Year
Ichiro Suzuki (2010)

All-Star Game MVP

Ken Griffey Jr. (1992)
Ichiro Suzuki (2007)
Robinson Canó (2017)

All-stars

1977 - Ruppert Jones
1978 - Craig Reynolds
1979 - Bruce Bochte
1980 - Rick Honeycutt
1981 - Tom Paciorek
1982 - Floyd Bannister
1983 - Matt Young
1984 - Alvin Davis
1985 - Phil Bradley
1986 - Jim Presley
1987 - Mark Langston and Harold Reynolds
1988 - Harold Reynolds
1989 - Jeffrey Leonard
1990 - Ken Griffey Jr. and Randy Johnson
1991 - Ken Griffey Jr.
1992 - Ken Griffey Jr. and Edgar Martínez
1993 - Ken Griffey Jr. and Randy Johnson
1994 - Ken Griffey Jr. and Randy Johnson
1995 - Ken Griffey Jr., Randy Johnson, Edgar Martínez, and Tino Martinez
1996 - Jay Buhner, Ken Griffey Jr., Edgar Martínez, Alex Rodriguez, and Dan Wilson
1997 - Joey Cora, Ken Griffey Jr., Randy Johnson, Edgar Martínez, and Alex Rodríguez
1998 - Ken Griffey Jr. and Alex Rodríguez
1999 - Ken Griffey Jr.
2000 - Edgar Martínez, Alex Rodríguez and Aaron Sele
2001 - Bret Boone, Mike Cameron, Freddy García, Edgar Martínez, Jeff Nelson, John Olerud, Kazuhiro Sasaki, and Ichiro Suzuki
2002 - Freddy García, Kazuhiro Sasaki and Ichiro Suzuki
2003 - Bret Boone, Shigetoshi Hasegawa, Edgar Martínez, Jamie Moyer, and Ichiro Suzuki
2004 - Ichiro Suzuki
2005 - Ichiro Suzuki
2006 - Jose Lopez and Ichiro Suzuki
2007 - J. J. Putz and Ichiro Suzuki
2008 - Ichiro Suzuki
2009 - Félix Hernández and Ichiro Suzuki
2010 - Ichiro Suzuki
2011 - Félix Hernández, Brandon League, and Michael Pineda
2012 - Félix Hernández
2013 - Félix Hernández and Hisashi Iwakuma
2014 - Robinson Canó, Félix Hernández, Fernando Rodney, and Kyle Seager
2015 - Nelson Cruz, Félix Hernández
2016 - Robinson Canó
2017 - Robinson Canó, Nelson Cruz
2018 - Nelson Cruz, Jean Segura, Mitch Haniger, and Edwin Díaz
2019 - Daniel Vogelbach
2021 - Yusei Kikuchi
2022 - Julio Rodríguez, Ty France

MLB All-Century Team (1999)

Ken Griffey Jr.

Players Choice Awards Player of the Decade (1999)

Ken Griffey Jr. (1999)

Sporting News AL Pitcher of the Year

Randy Johnson (1995)

Baseball Prospectus Internet Baseball Awards AL Cy Young
See: Baseball Prospectus#Internet Baseball Awards
Freddy García (2001)
Félix Hernández (2010)

Baseball Prospectus Internet Baseball Awards AL Rookie of the Year
See: Baseball Prospectus#Internet Baseball Awards
Ichiro Suzuki (2001)
Michael Pineda (2011)

Baseball America All-Rookie Team
See: Baseball America#Baseball America All-Rookie Team
2011 – Dustin Ackley (2B), Mike Carp (OF; one of three), and Michael Pineda (SP; one of five)

Topps All-Star Rookie teams

 Ruppert Jones OF (1977)
 Ed Vande Berg LHP (1982)
 Matt Young LHP (1983)
 Alvin Davis 1B and Mark Langston LHP (1984)
 Jay Buhner OF (1985)
 Danny Tartabull OF (1986)
 Greg Briley OF and Ken Griffey Jr. (1989)
 Dave Fleming LHP (1992)
 John Halama LHP (1999)
 Kazuhiro Sasaki RHP (2000)
 Ichiro Suzuki OF (2001)
 Roenis Elías LHP (2014)

Hutch Award

Jamie Moyer (2003)

Lou Gehrig Memorial Award

Jamie Moyer (2003)

Other achievements

National Baseball Hall of Fame
See: .

Seattle Mariners Hall of Fame
See: 

Retired numbersSee: .Ford C. Frick Award (broadcasters)See:

World Baseball Classic All-WBC Team
 – Michael Saunders (OF)

Best Male Athlete ESPY Award

Ken Griffey Jr. (1998; with Tiger Woods)

American League statistical batting leaders

Batting average
Edgar Martínez (.343, 1992)
Edgar Martínez (.356, 1995)
Alex Rodriguez (.358, 1996)
Ichiro Suzuki (.350, 2001)
Ichiro Suzuki (.372, 2004) Team Record

On-base %
Edgar Martínez (.479, 1995) Team Record
Edgar Martínez (.464, 1996)
Edgar Martínez (.456, 1997)

Slugging percentage
Ken Griffey Jr. (.646, 1997)

OPS
Edgar Martínez (1.107, 1995) Team Record

Games
Willie Horton (162, 1979) co-leader
Ruppert Jones (162, 1979) co-leader
Raúl Ibañez (162, 2005 & 2008) co-leader
Ichiro Suzuki (162, 2005 & 2008 & 2010) co-leader

At bats
Harold Reynolds (642, 1990)
Alex Rodriguez (686, 1998)
Ichiro Suzuki (692, 2001)
Ichiro Suzuki (704, 2004) Team Record
Ichiro Suzuki (679, 2005)
Ichiro Suzuki (695, 2006)

Runs
Edgar Martínez (121, 1995)
Alex Rodriguez (141, 1996) Team Record
Ken Griffey Jr. (125, 1997)

Hits
Alex Rodriguez (213, 1998)
Ichiro Suzuki (242, 2001)
Ichiro Suzuki (262, 2004) Major League Record
Ichiro Suzuki (224, 2006)
Ichiro Suzuki (238, 2007)
Ichiro Suzuki (213, 2008)
Ichiro Suzuki (225, 2009)
Ichiro Suzuki (214, 2010)

Total bases
Ken Griffey Jr. (359, 1993)
Alex Rodriguez (379, 1996)
Ken Griffey Jr. (393, 1997) Team Record

Singles
Ichiro Suzuki (192, 2001)
Ichiro Suzuki (165, 2002)
Ichiro Suzuki (162, 2003)
Ichiro Suzuki (225, 2004) Major League Record
Ichiro Suzuki (158, 2005)
Ichiro Suzuki (186, 2006)
Ichiro Suzuki (179, 2009)

Doubles
Edgar Martínez (46, 1992)
Edgar Martínez (52, 1995)
Alex Rodriguez (54, 1996) Team Record

Triples
Harold Reynolds (11, 1988)

Home runs
Ken Griffey Jr. (40, 1994)
Ken Griffey Jr. (56, 1997) Team Record
Ken Griffey Jr. (56, 1998) Team Record
Ken Griffey Jr. (48, 1999)

RBI
Ken Griffey Jr. (147, 1997) Team Record
Edgar Martínez (145, 2000)
Bret Boone (141, 2001)

Strikeouts
Jay Buhner (159, 1996)
Jay Buhner (175, 1997)
Mike Cameron (176, 2002) Team Record
Richie Sexson (167, 2005)

Stolen bases
Harold Reynolds (60, 1987) Team Record
Julio Cruz (59, 1978)
Ichiro Suzuki (56, 2001)

Runs created
Edgar Martínez (153, 1995)
Alex Rodriguez (157, 1996) Team Record
Ken Griffey Jr. (150, 1997)

Extra-base hits
Ken Griffey Jr. (86, 1993)
Ken Griffey Jr. (93, 1997) Team Record

Times on base
Edgar Martínez (306, 1995)
Edgar Martínez (309, 1997)
Edgar Martínez (288, 1998)
Ichiro Suzuki (315, 2004) Team Record

Hit by pitch
Dave Valle (17, 1993) 
Mike Zunino (17, 2014)
Ty France (27, 2021), Co-Leader Team Record

Sacrifices
Jose Lopez (12, 2006)

Sacrifice flies
Alvin Davis (10, 1991) Co-Leader
John Olerud (12, 2002)

Intentional walks
Ken Griffey Jr. (23, 1997)
Ken Griffey Jr. (17, 1999) Co-Leader
Ichiro Suzuki (27, 2002) Team Record
Ichiro Suzuki (19, 2004)
Ichiro Suzuki (15, 2009)

Grounded into double plays
Bruce Bochte (27, 1979)
John Olerud (21, 2001)

At bats per strikeout
Ichiro Suzuki (13.1, 2001)

At bats per home run
Ken Griffey Jr. (10.9, 1997)
Ken Griffey Jr. (11.3, 1998)

Outs
Harold Reynolds (516, 1990) Team Record
Harold Reynolds (510, 1991)
Alex Rodríguez (505, 1998)

American League Statistical Pitching Leaders

ERA
Randy Johnson (2.48, 1995)
Freddy García (3.05, 2001)
Félix Hernández (2.27, 2010)
Félix Hernández (2.14, 2014) Team Record

Wins
Félix Hernández (19, 2009) Co-Leader

Win–loss percentage
Randy Johnson (.900, 1995) Team Record
Randy Johnson (.833, 1997)
Félix Hernández (.792, 2009)

WHIP
Randy Johnson (1.045, 1995)
Félix Hernández (1.057, 2010)
Félix Hernández (0.915, 2014) Team Record

Hits allowed/9 innings pitched
Randy Johnson (6.59, 1992)
Randy Johnson (6.52, 1993)
Randy Johnson (6.68, 1995)
Randy Johnson (6.21, 1997) Team Record
Félix Hernández (7.542, 2009)
Félix Hernández (6.483, 2014)

Strikeouts/9 innings pitched
Mark Langston (8.16, 1984)
Mark Langston (9.21, 1986)
Mark Langston (8.67, 1987)
Randy Johnson (10.31, 1992)
Randy Johnson (10.86, 1993)
Randy Johnson (10.67, 1994)
Randy Johnson (12.35, 1995) Team Record
Randy Johnson (12.30, 1997)

Games
Ed Vande Berg (78, 1982) Team Record

Innings
Freddy García (238 ⅔, 2001)
Félix Hernández (249 ⅔, 2010)

Strikeouts
Floyd Bannister (209, 1982)
Mark Langston (204, 1984)
Mark Langston (245, 1986)
Mark Langston (262, 1987)
Randy Johnson (241, 1992)
Randy Johnson (308, 1993) Team Record
Randy Johnson (204, 1994)
Randy Johnson (294, 1995)

Games started
Mike Moore (37, 1986) co-leader Team Record
Jeff Fassero (35, 1997) co-leader

Complete games
Randy Johnson (9, 1994)

Shutouts
Randy Johnson (4, 1994) Team Record
Joel Piñeiro (2, 2003) Co-Leader

Home runs allowed
Rich DeLucia (31, 1991)
Ryan Franklin (34, 2003) co-leader
Jamie Moyer (44, 2004) Team Record

Walks allowed
Mark Langston (118, 1984)
Randy Johnson (120, 1990)
Randy Johnson (152, 1991) Team Record
Randy Johnson (144, 1992)

Hits allowed
Mike Moore (279, 1986) Team Record
Mike Moore (268, 1987)

Strikeout to walk
Randy Johnson (4.52, 1995)

Losses
Matt Young (19, 1985) Team Record
Mike Morgan (17, 1986)
Mike Moore (19, 1987) Team Record
Erik Hanson (17, 1992)

Earned runs allowed
Mark Langston (129, 1986) Team Record
Mike Moore (121, 1987)

Wild pitches
Gaylord Perry (13, 1982)
 Félix Hernández (17, 2009) Co-Leader
 Félix Hernández (18, 2014)

Hit batsmen
Randy Johnson (18, 1992) Team Record
Randy Johnson (16, 1993)

Batters faced
Mike Moore (1,145, 1986) Team Record

Oldest player
Gaylord Perry (43, 1982)
Rich Gossage (42, 1994)
Dennis Martínez (42, 1997)
Jamie Moyer (42, 2005)
Jamie Moyer (43, 2006) Team Record

Youngest player
Edwin Núñez (19, 1982)
Edwin Núñez (20, 1983)
Alex Rodríguez (18, 1994) Team Record
Alex Rodríguez (19, 1995)
Félix Hernández (19, 2005)
Félix Hernández (20, 2006)

See also
Baseball awards

References 

Awa
Major League Baseball team trophies and awards